Kortney Ryan Ziegler (born December 15, 1981) is an American entrepreneur, filmmaker, visual artist, blogger, writer, and scholar based in Oakland, California. His artistic and academic work focuses on queer/trans issues, body image, racialized sexualities, gender, performance and black queer theory.

Biography
Ziegler was born in Compton, California. Raised in a family of single black women, his mother struggled with mental illness and drug abuse. His father was absent and he lived with three alcoholic uncles who inflicted physical and emotional abuse on the women in his family.

He was the first in his family to attend post-secondary institution.  He went on to pursue his master's degree at San Francisco State University and later his PhD at Northwestern University. During this time, he slowly began his transition, though  when he began his doctoral program he checked female. In his third year he began to identify as genderqueer and started taking hormones. In 2011 he began to defend his dissertation on queer, black and Latino filmmakers. He was the first person to receive the PhD in African-American studies from Northwestern University.

He currently resides in Oakland, California.

Career

Blogging

blac (k) ademic 
From 2003 to 2006, Ziegler maintained a popular black queer feminist blog, blac (k) ademic. The blog tackled topics such as gender and sexuality from a young black queer academic perspective, eventually becoming one of the top blogs in the feminist blogsphere.

Ziegler endured much controversy due to his radical stance that positioned the experiences of women of color as the locus of his feminist analysis. Ziegler shut down the blog due to the many negative comments he was receiving. Blac (k) ademic went on to receive the award for Best Topical Blog in the first annual Black Weblog Awards in 2006. It relaunched in November 2012 and was nominated for a GLAAD Media Award and a Transguy Community Award.

Film

STILL BLACK: a Portrait of Black Transmen 
Premiering in 2008, STILL BLACK: a Portrait of Black Transmen was conceived during the years Ziegler was a doctoral student in the department of African-American studies at Northwestern University. The film explores the theme of female to male transgender transition in the African American community. Ziegler and his producer, Awilda Rodriguez Lora, provided the initial financial investment to get the project off the ground. They employed a grassroots fundraising method, using social networking to secure funds to complete the project. Upon release to the queer film festival circuit, the film became one of the most sought after and talked about films representing the trans man-of-color experience, showing to sold-out crowds in cities such as Los Angeles, Toronto, Seattle, Chicago, and Tel-Aviv. The film received an Isaac Julien Experimental Award from Queer Black Cinema International Music Festival and an Audience Choice Award for Best Documentary in the ReelOut Queer Film + Video Festival.

Technology
In 2013, Ziegler launched Trans*H4ck, an organizational hub for trans people collaborating on technical projects. It first began as a two hack-a-thon which was aimed to address specific issues in the transgender community. During the hack-a-thon developers, programmers, designers, entrepreneurs, and community members came together to brainstorm new ideas and create technological advances digital tools to better the trans community. This was used as digital activist movement to help spread the word of an underrepresented community and raise money through crowdfunding. Over the two day hack-a-thon partners got to know each other, and heard about the social injustices facing transgender and non gender-conforming people.

Along with Tiffany Mikell, he also founded BSMdotCo, an educational technology startup company. Together they created Aerial Spaces. This is a video based forum which allows educators to reach a wider audience of learners.

In 2017, Ziegler and Mikell cofounded Appolition.us in order to help incarcerated Black people return to their families by allowing users to round up purchases to the nearest dollar and donate the funds to bail funding efforts. The app was supported through crowdfunding after a tweet from Ziegler got attention during July 2017.

Community outreach 
In 2011 he became the co-owner of Halmoni, a vintage boutique that promotes healthy body positivity and self-love for women. In 2013 Ziegler also founded Who We Know, a group that focuses on creating products and developing initiatives to economically empower the transgender color community.

Honors and awards
 2006 Best Topical Blog, Black Weblog Awards - "blac (k) ademic"
 2009 Best Documentary, Reelout Queer Film + Video Festival - STILL BLACK: a portrait of black transmen
 Trans 100 Honoree
 2013 GLAAD Media Award Nomination for Outstanding Blog
 2013 Empowerment Award, Black Transmen, Inc.
 2013 Outstanding Transgender Service, The Esteem Awards
 2013 Top 40 under 40 LGBT Activist, The Advocate 
 2013 Authentic Life Award, Transgender Law Center
 2017 Diablo magazine's 40 Under 40 award winner

References

External links
blackademic.com 
Kortney Ziegler at Model View Culture

1980 births
Living people
American filmmakers
African-American feminists
American feminists
Male feminists
Men and masculinities scholars
Transgender artists
Transgender men
American transgender writers
LGBT African Americans
LGBT people from California
Transfeminists
People from Compton, California
Artists from Oakland, California
Queer artists
Queer feminists
Queer men
Queer theorists
Queer writers
University of California, Santa Cruz alumni
San Francisco State University alumni
Northeastern University alumni
Feminist bloggers
American male bloggers
American bloggers